John O'Meara (1856 – 3 July 1904) was a Liberal Party Member of Parliament in New Zealand.

Private life
O'Meara was born in Australia in 1856. He came to New Zealand with his family in 1868, and joined the Post and Telegraph Department in 1871. After that, he was in business in Queenstown in Otago. His sister married Albert Eichardt, the owner of Eichardt's Hotel. Soon after the November  election, he moved to Woodville in the Manawatū-Whanganui region. He became an auctioneer by trade.

Political career

O'Meara was chairman of the Lake County Council for some time, and a member of the Queenstown Borough Council. When Thomas Fergus retired from the  electorate prior to the 1893 election, O'Meara was one of three candidates for the position; William Fraser won the election, and O'Meara came a distant second but ahead of William Larnach.

He was still relatively unknown in the Pahiatua electorate when he stood in the 1896 general election, and to the surprise of many, he defeated Robert Manisty and William Wilson McCardle. O'Meara held the Pahiatua electorate until his sudden death in 1904. In 1903 he was elected as the Liberal Party's senior whip in which role he was to serve until his death.

Death
O'Meara died unexpectedly on 3 July 1904. Returning home from a bike ride, he had just passed his housekeeper when she heard him crash onto the gravel driveway; he was dead before a doctor arrived 15 minutes later. An autopsy found that an artery carrying blood to his brain was blocked. He was survived by his wife and eight children.

Notes

References

New Zealand Liberal Party MPs
1856 births
1904 deaths
People from Woodville, New Zealand
People from Queenstown, New Zealand
Australian emigrants to New Zealand
19th-century New Zealand politicians